Kyriakoulis Petrou Mavromichalis (1850–1916) was a Greek politician of the late 19th and early 20th centuries who briefly served as the 30th Prime Minister of Greece.

Mavromichalis was born in Athens in 1850 into the renowned Mavromichalis family of Mani, which had fought during the Greek War of Independence. He was first elected to the Hellenic Parliament in 1879 and served as: Interior Minister (1895–1897, 1902–1903 and 1905) and Minister for Military Affairs (1904–1905), before becoming Prime Minister of Greece following the Goudi Revolt by the Military League and the fall of the Dimitrios Rallis government in 1909.

Under pressure from the League, Mavromichalis passed a large amount of ground-breaking legislation that the League demanded, including organization of the army, the justice and educational systems, and governmental organization.

Mavromichalis resigned as Prime Minister in January 1910, after a disagreement with the Military League. He died in Athens in 1916 and was buried with full honours.

He was a great-uncle of Princess Aspasia of Greece.

References

1850 births
1916 deaths
20th-century prime ministers of Greece
Foreign ministers of Greece
Greek MPs 1879–1881
People from Athens
Politicians from Athens
Prime Ministers of Greece
Kyriakoulis
Ministers of Military Affairs of Greece
Justice ministers of Greece
Ministers of the Interior of Greece